Nyaungshwe Township is a township of Taunggyi District in Shan State, Myanmar. It is located south of Sakangyi and south-west of Taunggyi. The principal town is Nyaungshwe.

Inle Lake, a popular tourist destination and an inland freshwater lake, is located south of Nyaungshwe town. Part of Inlay Lake Wetland Sanctuary lies in Nyaungshwe, Pinlaung and Pekon Township.

History

Nyaungshwe was formerly the capital of Yawnghwe, one of many Shan principalities in pre-colonial and colonial Burma (collectively called the Shan States). Nyaungshwe is a Burmese language approximation of the Shan name, Yawnghwe.

Nyaungshwe town 
The town of Nyaungshwe comprises 8 wards, namely Kantha, Thasi, Nandawun, Myole, Win, Nangpang, Mingala, and Maineli.

Nyaungshwe is the tourist hub for visiting Inle Lake and Inlay Lake Wetland Sanctuary. It consists of one main thoroughfare with numerous side streets and a few parallel roads. The main street has numerous shops, several restaurants, a few stupas, travel agencies and a market (located behind the storefronts). Near the end of this road, a bridge crosses the river channel near an impressive mirror-tiled stupa.

The town serves as a marina for the numerous long boats carrying tourists into the lake. The lake itself is located a few kilometers south through a river channel. Nyaungshwe can be reached by bus, car, or by plane via the airport in Heho, located about a one-hour drive away. Nearby in Shwenyaung there is a train station with services to the mainline at Thazi, where connections to Yangon and Mandalay exist.

Demographics

2014 

The 2014 Myanmar Census reported that Nyaungshwe Township had a population of 189,407. The population density was 130.3 people per km². The census reported that the median age was 26.7 years, and 100 males per 100 females. There were 42,634 households; the mean household size was 4.2.

Attractions 

Nyaungshwe Township is home to Inle Lake and Inlay Lake Wetland Sanctuary, including the village of Ywama, which is home to a floating market. In addition, Nyaungshwe Township has several cultural attractions, including:

 Shwe Yaunghwe Kyaung, a wooden monastery dating to the 19th century
 Yadana Man Aung Pagoda
 Bawrithat Pagoda, founded by Anawrahta
 Museum of Shan Sawbwa.

References

External links

Satellite map at Maplandia.com

 
Townships of Shan State